Peter Akatsa (born 12 May, 1960) is a retired Kenyan field hockey player. He was part of the Kenya national field hockey team at the 1984 Summer Olympics in Los Angeles and at the 1988 Summer Olympics in Seoul. He currently lives in Lexington Kentucky.

References

External links

1960 births
Living people
Kenyan male field hockey players
Olympic field hockey players of Kenya
Field hockey players at the 1984 Summer Olympics
Field hockey players at the 1988 Summer Olympics
20th-century Kenyan people